Diaphanosoma fluviatile is a species of freshwater ctenopod in the family Sididae. Native to Central and South America, it has been found in lakes farther to the north. In 2008 it was reported to have been found in central Texas. In 2018 it was reported that D. fluviatile has been found in western Lake Erie.

References

Cladocera
Crustaceans described in 1899